Ulloor is a city locality in the Thiruvananthapuram, Kerala, India. It was the home of the modern Malayalam triumvirate poet Ulloor S. Parameswara Iyer.  The Government Medical College, Thiruvananthapuram and Credence Hospital Thiruvananthapuram, Sree Uthram Thirunal Royal Hospital are located at Ulloor. Ulloor comes under Cheruvaikkal village limits of Thiruvananthapuram taluk. It comes under Kazhakootam legislative assembly constituency and Thiruvananthapuram Lok Sabha constituency.
Among the devotional buildings in Ulloor are Ulloor Balasubrahmanya Swamy temple, St. Mary's Church and St. Alphonsa Church.

Notable people
 Ulloor S. Parameswara Iyer

References

Suburbs of Thiruvananthapuram